Giewartów  is a village in the administrative district of Gmina Ostrowite, within Słupca County, Greater Poland Voivodeship, in west-central Poland.

More inf. (only PL) at Giewartów funpage

References

Villages in Słupca County